Chrislehurston is a suburb of Johannesburg, South Africa. It is located in Region E of the City of Johannesburg Metropolitan Municipality.

History
The suburb is situated on part of an old Witwatersrand farm called Syferfontein. It was established in 1958 and was named after Chislehurst, Kent.

References

Johannesburg Region E